Medininkai is a village in Lithuania, located  east of Vilnius city municipality and  from the Lithuanian–Belarusian border. 

The village is situated on the Medininkai Highland, near the highest points of Lithuania – the Juozapinė Hill and Aukštojas Hill. The village is famous for the ruins of the Medininkai Castle. On 31 July 1991 the Lithuanian border post was attacked by Soviet OMON forces. Seven Lithuanian volunteer officers were shot, while Tomas Šernas barely survived. The village was briefly featured in the 2007 movie, Hannibal Rising.

Demographics
According to the 2001 census, the village had 508 residents., but this number shrank to 493 in 2011 and to 413 as of 2021 census. Medininkai is the administrative center of an eldership. According to a 2010 eldership report, it had 1374 residents, of whom 92.3% were Poles, 3.2% Lithuanians, and 2.9% Russians. During the census of 2021, there were 953 inhabitants in Medininkai Eldership of which, 741 or 77,8% were Poles, 94 or 9,9% – Lithuanians, 54 or 5,7% – Belarusians, 37 or 3,9% – Russians and 15 other peoples.

See also
Soviet OMON assaults on Lithuanian border posts

References

Vilnius District Municipality
Villages in Vilnius County
Vilnius Voivodeship
Vilensky Uyezd
Wilno Voivodeship (1926–1939)